Tsuge may refer to:

 Buxus microphylla (Japanese Box or Littleleaf Box), a tree called  in Japanese.
 , a village located in Yamabe District, Nara Prefecture, Japan.
  was a town located in Ayama District, Mie Prefecture, Japan.
 , a railway station in Iga, Mie Prefecture, Japan.
 , a Kusu-class patrol frigate of the Japan Maritime Self-Defense Force, formerly USS Gloucester (PF-22)
 , a Japanese cartoonist and essayist.